Saw Hnit (1310s–1325) was governor of Toungoo from 1324 to 1325. He inherited the office after his father Thawun Nge's death in 1324. Because he was still a young adult, his mother Saw Sala ruled the Toungoo region, then a vassal state of Pinya. He was killed a year later during a coup organized by Chief Minister Kayin Ba, who had served under Toungoo rulers since 1279. Saw Sala escaped but died on the run near Taungdwingyi.

References

Bibliography
 

Pinya dynasty
1310s births
1325 deaths